This is a list of economic sanctions involving Australia.

By Australia

On Australia

References

Notes

Australia
Sanctions